Hein Vanhaezebrouck (born 16 February 1964) is a Belgian football manager who is currently leading K.A.A. Gent in the Belgian First Division A. He has a reputation of favouring an offensive style of play.

Early life
Vanhaezebrouck was born in Kortrijk and raised in Lauwe.

Career
Hein Vanhaezebrouck is a former player for KV Kortrijk, KRC Harelbeke and Sporting Lokeren, among other clubs.

Vanhaezebrouck left White Star Lauwe to become the coach of KV Kortrijk on 1 July 2006, replacing Manu Ferrera. In 2007–08 Vanhaezebrouck led Kortrijk to promotion to the first division football by winning the second division title.  In the Belgian Cup, Kortrijk finished in the quarter finals against KAA Gent, despite a 5–1 victory in the home game. This confrontation and the offensive play of Kortrijk aroused the interest of KAA Gent to succeed Trond Sollied as head coach. However, at the end of April 2008, Vanhaezebrouck signed a contract renewal of two years (until 2010) at Kortrijk. Right there, he became well known for the acquisition of Google-striker Istvan Bakx. Vanhaezebrouck discovered Bakx by Internet browser Google.

At the start of the 2009–10 season, Vanhaezebrouck went to KRC Genk. He was fired as coach of KRC Genk on 29 November 2009. At that time, Genk was 12th in the ranking after 16 games. His successor was Franky Vercauteren.

In June 2010, Vanhaezebrouck decided to return to KV Kortrijk for the 2010–11 season. The team finished tenth in the rankings. The following year, the team reached the cup final, losing 1–0 against Sporting Lokeren. On 10 May 2013, it was announced that he had re-signed with KV Kortrijk.

In May 2014, he decided to leave KV Kortrijk for KAA Gent. There, he reached his biggest success, as he won, after his championships with Kortrijk in Third and Second Division, also the championship with Gent in First Division in 2015, after a 2-0 victory against Standard Liège, and met European success with KAA Gent, in both the UEFA Champions League, reaching the 2nd round (season 2015-2016), and in the UEFA Europa League, reaching the 3rd round (season 2016-2017).

In October 2017 Vanhaezebrouck signed for RSC Anderlecht. The first season was extremely disappointing  and
on 17 December 2018 Vanhaezebrouck was sacked. 

During the 2006 World Cup, he was an analyst and commentor on VT4, and has since 2016 served as analyst on Sporting Telenet.

Managerial statistics

Honours

Manager 
AA Gent

 Belgian Pro League: 2014–15
 Belgian Cup: 2021–22
 Belgian Super Cup: 2015

Individual 

 Belgian Professional Manager of the Year: 2011-12
 Belgian Sports Coach of the Year: 2015,
 Best Football Coach of the Year: 2015
 Guy Thys Award: 2015
 Raymond Goethals Award: 2015

References

1968 births
Belgian footballers
Belgian football managers
K.A.A. Gent managers
K.R.C. Genk managers
K.V. Kortrijk managers
R.S.C. Anderlecht managers
Living people
Sportspeople from Kortrijk
Association football defenders
Belgian Pro League managers